Diya may refer to:
 Diya (film), 2018 Tamil- and Telugu-language film
 Diya (Islam), Islamic term for monetary compensation for bodily harm or property damage
 Diya (lamp), ghee- or oil-based candle often used in South Asian religious ceremonies and worship
 Diya (name), list of people with the name
 Diya TV, American TV network dedicated to South Asian programming
 Diya Women Football Club, Pakistani football club in Karachi
 Ad-Diya, cultural magazine in Egypt

See also
 Dia (disambiguation)
 Diaa, given name
 Diia, Ukrainian electronic public administration platform
 Deeya, given name